Kevrenn Alre ("Bagad and Celtic Circle of Auray" in Breton language) is a group of music and dance of Breton traditional inspiration, created in 1951, by railroad employees of the marshalling yard of Auray (Morbihan, Brittany).

Eight times national champion of bagadoù and ten times national champion of Breton dance, Kevrenn Alre takes place in an avant-gardist position of a Breton cultural movement (Bagad, Celtic circle, show / concert) and of pioneer by compositions and scenic creations combining modernism, musical fusions and dances. The musicians, devoted workers with a union which makes their strength, built up to themselves a style, a sonority jazz with the addition of a writing desk clarinet stemming from the music school, and the working habits, as the week of repetition before Lorient competition.

Training is since its inception in relation to Celtic nations, in his music and in his travels. It has also proven export opportunities abroad, becoming ambassador of music and culture in Europe and in the world, with trips to countries such have Yugoslavia in 1962, the United States in 1989 and 2007 (invited by the Irish band The Chieftains on stage at Carnegie Hall) and China in 2008.

Honours

National Bagadoù Championship 

Kevrenn Alre played in the first class. The third most successful training history, Kevrenn Alre was crowned eight-time champion of Brittany: 1979, 1981, 1983, 1986, 1992, 1996, 2005 and 2006. Kevrenn Alre is vice-champion in 2007, 2008 and 2009 and finished many years in third place (2011, 2012...).

National Breton dance Championship 
Kevrenn Alré is classified as category "Excellence" by Kendalc'h confederation. It won ten league titles in Brittany Championship: from 1986 to 1992 and again in 1996, 1997 and 1999.

Discography 
 1988 : Musique, chants et danses
 1990 : Kevrenn Alré  
 1997 La.ri.don.gé!
 2001 50 ans
 2006 : Dañs Ar Bleiz (2CD)
 2008 : Alre en Iliz (CD/DVD)

Participations 
 1984 : Bodadeg ar Sonerion : daou ugent vloaz e servij sonerezh Breizh ("Assembly of ringers: 40 years in the service of Breton music") 
 2003 : A toi et ceux – Dan Ar Braz 
 2006 : Bagad ! Une légende bretonne ("Bagad! A Breton legend" CD/DVD)
 2006 : Phénomène Bagad – Barbara Froger (DVD) 
 2006 : Celtica (DVD) shows in Nantes
 2007 : Nuit de la Saint Patrick in Paris-Bercy
 2007 : Nuit Interceltique de Rennes (DVD)

References

  Kevrenn Alré, Kevrenn Alré (1951–1991) 40 ans, Auray, 1991

External links

 Official site

Musical groups established in 1951
Bagad
Celtic music groups
Celtic circles
1951 establishments in France